This is a list of notable hotels in Uganda.

Gulu
 Acholi Inn

Chobe (Murchison Falls National Park)
 Chobe Safari Lodge

Entebbe
 Imperial Golf View Hotel
 Imperial Resort Beach Hotel

Kampala
 Grand Imperial Hotel
 Hilton Garden Inn Kampala
 Imperial Royale Hotel
 Kampala Hilton Hotel
 Kampala Intercontinental Hotel
 Kampala Protea Hotel
 Kampala Serena Hotel
 Kampala Sheraton Hotel
 Kampala Speke Hotel
 Munyonyo Commonwealth Resort
 Speke Resort and Conference Center
 The Pearl of Africa Hotel Kampala

Lweeza, Wakiso District
 Lake Victoria Serena Resort

Masindi
 Masindi Hotel

References

External links
UTB starts classification of hotels
 Hospitality industry struggles to meet world standards
 

Hotels in Uganda
Tourism in Uganda
Uganda
Hotels